Patna Sahib Assembly constituency is one of 243 constituencies of legislative assembly of Bihar. It comes under Patna Sahib Lok Sabha constituency. This constituency is Kushwaha and Yadav dominated.

Members of Legislative Assembly

Election results

2020

2015

2010

See also
 List of Assembly constituencies of Bihar

References

External links
 

Assembly constituencies in Patna district
Assembly constituencies of Bihar
Politics of Patna district